Chalmington is a small hamlet close to the village of Cattistock, in west Dorset, England.

References

External links

Hamlets in Dorset